Shine  is the debut solo album by Swedish singer Anette Olzon, released on 26 March (Sweden), 28 March (Germany, Finland, Russia, Spain), 31 March (France, the Netherlands, Belgium, Luxembourg, Poland, Czech Republic, Norway, Denmark, the UK), 1 April (Italy), and 8 April 2014 (USA) by earMUSIC.

The first teaser track from the album, "Falling" was released for digital download on 17 December 2013, accompanied by a lyric video on YouTube. A teaser for the album's first official single, "Lies", was posted on Anette Olzon's official Facebook page on 7 February 2014; followed by the single's eventual release on 14 February 2014.

Background, composing, concept, song information 
The writing process for the album began in 2009, during the Dark Passion Play World Tour of Olzon's then current band Nightwish, and lasted until shortly before the album's release. In 2011, Olzon posted the demo recordings of two songs, "Invincible" and "Floating", on her Myspace profile, claiming those were rough versions of the songs without mixing or producing.

Olzon considers Shine a "personal" album and has once stated that the lyrics reflect her views of life, which "has always been divided into black and white - dark and light" for her. The song "Moving Away" was written after her mother was diagnosed with cancer.

The cover art shows Anette among some trees doing what was called her "shine pose". She commented that she wanted the cover "to be something with nature":

Track listing

Chart performance

References

External links
Anette Olzon's Official Facebook Page

2014 debut albums
Anette Olzon albums